Severe Tropical Storm Lekima, known in the Philippines as Tropical Depression Hanna was a deadly tropical storm that affected both Philippines and Vietnam. The fourteenth named storm of the 2007 Pacific typhoon season, Lekima formed from a quick-moving tropical depression on the Philippine Sea in late September. After crossing Luzon and leaving Philippine Area of Responsibility, the tropical depression organized into a tropical storm. Lekima would stay at peak intensity for the remainder of its life until the cyclone made a final landfall over Central Vietnam on October 3. The remnants dissipated over land later that day.

In the Philippines, Hanna brought heavy torrential rains to Luzon that caused landslides which killed eight people in the province of Ifugao, as well as flooding, infrastructure damage, agricultural damage and disruption of transportation service in other parts of the Philippines. In China, over 100,000 people were evacuated, six flights were cancelled and more than 20,000 fishing boats were recalled back to the harbors. Greatest impacts were reported in Vietnam, as the associated rains caused hundreds of homes to be destroyed. More than 6,000 houses were washed away by the storm and 52,000 others were damaged in Vietnam. Extensive regions were affected causing heavy damage to the local agriculture. Ultimately, 86 people were killed (of which 15 people were from the Thanh Hóa Province), and total damages were estimated to be at $131 million (2007 USD).

Meteorological history 

A tropical disturbance wave near the Philippines were detected to be developing and PAGASA quickly upgraded it to Tropical Depression Hanna on September 27. PAGASA upgraded it into a tropical storm the next day. It made landfall in central Luzon early on September 29, and at the same time JMA upgraded the developing system into a tropical depression, while JTWC started a TCFA shortly thereafter at 09:00 UTC on the same day. JMA declared the system Tropical Storm Lekima on the next day. It continued to strengthen and Lekima was upgraded into a severe tropical storm on September 30 by JMA and would remain as such until landfall. Meanwhile, JTWC upgraded Lekima into a typhoon in October 2 and it would also remain as such until landfall. Lekima was the largest newborn tropical system on record by diameter at 1700km at the time before being beaten by Tropical Storm Kompasu 14 years later by 200km.

Lekima made landfall on Quảng Trạch District, Quảng Bình Province, Vietnam at 12:00 UTC in October 3 as a severe tropical storm. JTWC published the last Tropical Cyclone Warning later that day at 18:00 UTC while downgrading Lekima into a tropical storm, and JMA followed the suit at the same time. On the next day, Lekima weakened into a tropical depression over Laos by JMA, but JTWC did not follow suit. Lekima dissipated over land on October 5.

Preparations and impact

Philippines
Hanna brought heavy rains to Luzon causing a landslide that killed eight people, including three children, in Ifugao province, while another person was found dead in Quezon City. Torrential rains also caused landslides, flooding, infrastructure damage, and disruption of transportation service in other parts of the country. A Office of Civil Defense administrator said that several people had to leave their homes, mainly in the north of the country, and that heavy rains damaged roads and bridges, as well as damaging the local agriculture.

China
Over 100,000 people were evacuated in southern China as the storm approached, six flights were cancelled and more than 20,000 fishing boats were recalled back to the harbors.

Vietnam
Over 400,000 people were reported to have been evacuated in Vietnam as the storm approached. Upon arrival, associated rains caused heavy damage as about hundreds of houses were destroyed, more than 6,000 houses were washed away by the storm and 52,000 others were damaged. Many regions were affected by the storm, causing heavy damage to the local agriculture. More than 10 million people were affected by the storm. In total, 86 people were killed, 15 of which were located in Thanh Hóa Province. Total damages were estimated to be at $131 million (2007 USD).

See also 

Tropical Storm Mirinae (2016)

Notes

References

External links 

 JMA General Information of Severe Tropical Storm Lekima (0714) from Digital Typhoon
 JMA Best Track Data of Severe Tropical Storm Lekima (0714) 
 JMA Best Track Data (Graphics) of Severe Tropical Storm Lekima (0714)
 JMA Best Track Data (Text)
 16W.LEKIMA from the U.S. Naval Research Laboratory

2007 Pacific typhoon season
Typhoons in Vietnam
Typhoons in the Philippines
Western Pacific severe tropical storms
Tropical Storm Lekima
2007 disasters in the Philippines
Lekima